All Star Comics Melbourne is an Australian comic book store co-owned by Mitchell Davies and Troy Varker. The store was first opened in February 2011  and in 2014, won the Spirit of Comics Retailer Award at the 26th annual Eisner Awards. The award was split with the Legend Comics & Coffee in Nebraska.

Awards
Spirit of Comics Retailer Award at the Eisner Awards (2013, nominated)
Spirit of Comics Retailer Award at the Eisner Awards (2014, won - split with Legend Comics & Coffee)

References

External links
 All Star Comics Melbourne at blogspot.com

Comics retailers
Bookshops of Australia
Retail buildings in Victoria (Australia)
Retail companies established in 2011
2011 establishments in Australia
Companies based in Melbourne
2011 in comics